Sofia Giordano (1778–1829) was an Italian painter.

Giordano was born to poor parents in Turin as Sofia Clerc. Her maiden name has been also given variously as Clerk, Le Clerc, Leclerk, and other variants on the same. Early in life she evinced a talent for drawing, and the painter Pietro Jacopo Palmieri recommended further study, in which she was supported by banker Giacinto Vinay. At 18 she went to Rome to study miniature painting and pastel with Therese Maron. During this time she became a member of the Accademia Nazionale di San Luca, upon which occasion her portrait, still held by the Accademia, was painted by Giovanni Domenico Cherubini. She produced three pastel copies during this period of her study before turning to painting miniatures on ivory. In 1803 she married the surgeon Giovanni Giordano, continuing to paint and exhibit under her maiden name. She continued to produce pastels, and began working in oil on canvas as well. In 1812 the Turin Academy awarded her a gold medal for her work. Giordano had two children and died of a nervous fever.

Giordano's work won the acclaim of Napoleon Bonaparte, among others.

References

1778 births
1829 deaths
18th-century Italian painters
18th-century Italian women artists
19th-century Italian painters
19th-century Italian women artists
Artists from Turin
Italian women painters
Pastel artists